Live Alien Broadcasts is the first live album of Seattle band TAD, which was released in 1995.

Track listing

Vinyl bonus track

Personnel
Tad Doyle - Vocals, Guitar
Kurt Danielson - Bass, Vocals
Gary Thorstensen - Guitar, Vocals
Josh Sinder - Drums

Mark Naficy - Producer
Howie Weinberg - Mastering

References

Tad (band) albums
1995 albums